Yrjö Efraim Kivenoja (25 May 1880, in Kuopio – 3 July 1948; original surname Stenius) was a Finnish Lutheran clergyman and politician. At first a member of the National Coalition Party, he later joined the Patriotic People's Movement (IKL), which he represented in the Parliament of Finland from 1933 to 1936.

References

1880 births
1948 deaths
People from Kuopio
People from Kuopio Province (Grand Duchy of Finland)
20th-century Finnish Lutheran clergy
National Coalition Party politicians
Patriotic People's Movement (Finland) politicians
Members of the Parliament of Finland (1933–36)
University of Helsinki alumni
Finnish fascists